In Pacific Gas & Electric Co. v. State Energy Resources Conservation & Development Commission, 461 U.S. 190 (1983), the United States Supreme Court held that a state statute regulating economic aspects of nuclear generating plants was not preempted by the federal Atomic Energy Act of 1954.  The case provides a framework that has guided other cases involving preemption of federal authority.

Background

The issue of nuclear waste:  The radioactive waste fuel in a nuclear reactor must be periodically removed. Because nuclear power plant operators originally assumed that the fuel would be reprocessed, storage pools made to hold it were relatively limited in capacity and design. Over time, however, it became clear that the fuel would not be reprocessed. This resulted in large stores of radioactive waste.  As a result, as Justice White noted, that "problems of how and whereto store nuclear wastes [have] engendered considerable scientific, political, and public debate."

California statute:  Responding to these concerns, California in 1974 enacted the Warren-Alquist State Energy Resources Conservation and Development Act, Cal. Pub. Res. Code §§ 25000 et seq.  Under the act, which was amended in 1976 to add new regulations, operators of nuclear and certain other power plants had to apply for certification by the new State Energy Resources Conservation and Development Commission, or "Energy Commission" for short. Two sections in particular became the subject of dispute:
Section 25524.1(b) provided that the Energy Commission had the authority to determine, prior to the building of a new nuclear power plant, that there would be adequate storage space for the spent fuel rods "at the time such nuclear facility requires such storage."
Section 25524.2 addressed long-term concerns arising from nuclear wastes by placing a moratorium, or stoppage, on the certification of new plants until the Energy Commission "finds that there has been developed and that the United States through its authorized agency has approved and there exists a demonstrated technology or means for the disposal of high-level nuclear waste."
 
Dispute: Two California public utilities, Pacific Gas and Electric and San Diego Gas & Electric Companies, filed an action in federal district court seeking a declaratory judgment that these two provisions of the Warren-Alquist act (as well as various others) were invalid under the Supremacy Clause of the United States Constitution because they were preempted by (conflicted with) the Atomic Energy Act.  The federal district court agreed.

Appeal:  The Ninth Circuit held:
Petitioners had standing to challenge the statute (upholding the district court),
25524.1(b), regarding spent fuel storage, was not ripe for review (overturning the district court).  The reason given for this was that "we cannot know whether the Energy Commission will ever find a nuclear plant's storage capacity to be inadequate."
25524.2, creating the moratorium, was not preempted (overturning the district court), because sections 271 and 274(k) of the Atomic Energy Act authorized the states to regulate nuclear power plants "for purposes other than protection against radiation hazards," and that is what this section did:  it dealt with economic aspects of the nuclear fuel cycle, and was not designed to provide protection against radiation hazards.

Explanation of case's title:  The Supreme Court granted certiorari to this case.  The Court of Appeals for the Ninth Circuit had also consolidated another federal district court case, Pacific Legal Foundation v. State Energy Resources Conservation and Development Commission, which challenged other portions of the California statute into the Pacific Gas case. Although this second district court case gave the appellate court decision its name, the Supreme Court denied certiorari on that case's portion of the appellate decision.

Decision
The Court affirmed in a unanimous decision.

Ripeness
First, Justice White affirmed the appellate court's reasoning that Section 25524.1(b) (California's provision regarding spent fuel storage) was not ripe for review, while Section 25524.2 was ripe.

We agree that the challenge to 25524.2 is ripe for judicial review, but that the questions concerning 25524.1(b) are not. The basic rationale of the ripeness doctrine "is to prevent the courts, through avoidance of premature adjudication, from entangling themselves in abstract disagreements over administrative policies, and also to protect the agencies from judicial interference until an administrative decision has been formalized and its effects felt in a concrete way by the challenging parties." Abbott Laboratories v. Gardner,  [461  U.S. 190, 201] 387  U.S. 136, 148 -149 (1967). In Abbott Laboratories, which remains our leading discussion of the doctrine, we indicated that the question of ripeness turns on "the fitness of the issues for judicial decision" and "the hardship to the parties of withholding court consideration." Id., at 149.

Both of these factors counsel in favor of finding the challenge to the waste disposal regulations in 25524.2 ripe for adjudication. The question of pre-emption is predominantly legal, and although it would be useful to have the benefit of California's interpretation of what constitutes a demonstrated technology or means for the disposal of high-level nuclear waste, resolution of the pre-emption issue need not await that development. Moreover, postponement of decision would likely work substantial hardship on the utilities. As the Court of Appeals cogently reasoned, for the utilities to proceed in hopes that, when the time for certification came, either the required findings would be made or the law would be struck down, requires the expenditures of millions of dollars over a number of years, without any certainty of recovery if certification were denied. 13  The construction of new nuclear facilities requires considerable advance planning - on the order of 12 to 14 years. 14  Thus, as in the Rail Reorganization Act Cases, 419  U.S. 102, 144 (1974), "decisions to be made now or in the short future may be affected" by whether we act. "`One does not have to await the consummation of threatened injury to obtain preventive relief. If the injury is certainly impending that is enough.'" Id., at 143, quoting Pennsylvania v. West Virginia, 262  U.S. 553, 593  (1923). To require the industry to proceed without knowing whether the moratorium is valid would impose a palpable [461  U.S. 190, 202] and considerable hardship on the utilities, and may ultimately work harm on the citizens of California. Moreover, if petitioners are correct that 25524.2 is void because it hinders the commercial development of atomic energy, "delayed resolution would frustrate one of the key purposes of the [Atomic Energy] Act." Duke Power Co. v. Carolina Environmental Study Group, Inc., 438  U.S. 59, 82 (1978). For these reasons, the issue of whether 25524.2 is pre-empted by federal law should be decided now. 15 [461  U.S. 190, 203]

Questions concerning the constitutionality of the interim storage provision, 25524.1(b), however, are not ripe for review. While the waste disposal statute operates on a statewide basis, the Energy Commission is directed to make determinations under 25524.1(b) on a case-by-case basis. As the Court of Appeals explained, because "we cannot know whether the Energy Commission will ever find a nuclear plant's storage capacity to be inadequate," judicial consideration of this provision should await further developments. 16  Furthermore, because we hold today that 25524.2 is not pre-empted by federal law, there is little likelihood that industry behavior would be uniquely affected by whatever uncertainty surrounds the interim storage provisions. In these circumstances, a court should not stretch to reach an early, and perhaps premature, decision respecting 25524.1(b).

Regarding Section  25524.1(b), White wrote that "a court should not stretch to reach an early, and perhaps a premature, decision regarding [it]." Section 25524.2 was ripe, for if power plants went ahead with their operations without knowing whether the moratorium imposed by the statute was valid, this "would impose a palpable and considerable hardship on the utilities, and may ultimately work harm on the citizens of California."

Preemption
The court briefly set out the legal framework for preemption.

It is well established that within constitutional limits Congress may pre-empt state authority by so stating in express terms. Jones v. Rath Packing Co., 430  U.S. 519, 525  (1977). Absent explicit pre-emptive language, Congress' intent [461  U.S. 190, 204] to supersede state law altogether may be found from a "`scheme of federal regulation . . . so pervasive as to make reasonable the inference that Congress left no room for the States to supplement it,' because `the Act of Congress may touch a field in which the federal interest is so dominant that the federal system will be assumed to preclude enforcement of state laws on the same subject,' or because `the object sought to be obtained by the federal law and the character of obligations imposed by it may reveal the same purpose.'" Fidelity Federal Savings & Loan Assn. v. De la Cuesta, 458  U.S. 141, 153  (1982), quoting Rice v. Santa Fe Elevator Corp.,  331  U.S. 218, 230 (1947). Even where Congress has not entirely displaced state regulation in a specific area, state law is pre-empted to the extent that it actually conflicts with federal law. Such a conflict arises when "compliance with both federal and state regulations is a physical impossibility," Florida Lime & Avocado Growers, Inc. v. Paul, 373  U.S. 132, 142 -143 (1963), or where state law "stands as an obstacle to the accomplishment and execution of the full purposes and objectives of Congress." Hines v. Davidowitz, 312  U.S. 52, 67 (1941). 

The court then concluded that 25524.2 was not preempted by the Atomic Energy Act.
The court responded to each of petitioner's three arguments.

Even a brief perusal of the Atomic Energy Act reveals that, despite its comprehensiveness, it does not at any point expressly require the States to construct or authorize nuclear powerplants or prohibit the States from deciding, as an absolute or conditional matter, not to permit the construction of any further reactors. Instead, petitioners argue that the Act is intended to preserve the Federal Government as the sole regulator of all matters nuclear, and that 25524.2 falls within the scope of this impliedly pre-empted field. But as we view the issue, Congress, in passing the 1954 Act and in subsequently amending it, intended that the Federal Government should regulate the radiological safety aspects involved in the construction and operation of a nuclear plant, but that the States retain their traditional responsibility in the field of regulating electrical utilities for determining questions of need, reliability, cost, and other related state concerns.

Need for new power facilities, their economic feasibility, and rates and services, are areas that have been characteristically governed by the States. Frost v. Corporation Comm'n, 278  U.S. 515, 534 (1929) (dissenting opinion). "The nature of government regulation of private utilities is such that a utility may frequently be required by the state regulatory scheme to obtain approval for practices a business regulated in less detail would be free to institute without any approval from a regulatory body." Jackson v. Metropolitan Edison Co., 419  U.S. 345, 357 (1974). See Central Hudson Gas & Electric Corp. v. Public Service Comm'n of New York, 447  U.S. 557, 569 (1980) ("The State's concern that rates be fair and efficient represents a clear and substantial governmental interest"). With the exception of the broad authority of the  [461  U.S. 190, 206] Federal Power Commission, now the Federal Energy Regulatory Commission, over the need for and pricing of electrical power transmitted in interstate commerce, see Federal Power Act, 16 U.S.C. 824 (1976 ed. and Supp. V), these economic aspects of electrical generation have been regulated for many years and in great detail by the States. 17  As we noted in Vermont Yankee Nuclear Power Corp. v. Natural Resources Defense Council, Inc., 435  U.S. 519, 550 (1978): "There is little doubt that under the Atomic Energy Act of 1954, state public utility commissions or similar bodies are empowered to make the initial decision regarding the need for power." Thus, "Congress legislated here in a field which the States have traditionally occupied. . . . So we start with the assumption that the historic police powers of the States were not to be superseded by the Federal Act unless that was the clear and manifest purpose of Congress." Rice v. Santa Fe Elevator Corp., supra, at 230.

The Atomic Energy Act must be read, however, against another background. Enrico Fermi demonstrated the first nuclear reactor in 1942, and Congress authorized civilian application of atomic power in 1946, Atomic Energy Act of 1946, see Act of Aug. 1, 1946, 60 Stat. 755, at which time the Atomic Energy Commission (AEC) was created. Until 1954, however, the use, control, and ownership of nuclear technology remained a federal monopoly. The Atomic Energy Act of 1954, Act of Aug. 30, 1954, 68 Stat. 919, as [461  U.S. 190, 207]  amended, 42 U.S.C. 2011 et seq. (1976 ed. and Supp. V), grew out of Congress' determination that the national interest would be best served if the Government encouraged the private sector to become involved in the development of atomic energy for peaceful purposes under a program of federal regulation and licensing. See H. R. Rep. No. 2181, 83d Cong., 2d Sess., 1-11 (1954). The Act implemented this policy decision by providing for licensing of private construction, ownership, and operation of commercial nuclear power reactors. Duke Power Co. v. Carolina Environmental Study Group, Inc., 438  U.S., at 63 . The AEC, however, was given exclusive jurisdiction to license the transfer, delivery, receipt, acquisition, possession, and use of nuclear materials. 42 U.S.C. 2014(e), (z), (aa), 2061-2064, 2071-2078, 2091-2099, 2111–2114 (1976 ed. and Supp. V). Upon these subjects, no role was left for the States.

The Commission, however, was not given authority over the generation of electricity itself, or over the economic question whether a particular plant should be built. We observed in Vermont Yankee, supra, at 550, that "[t]he Commission's prime area of concern in the licensing context, . . . is national security, public health, and safety." See also Power Reactor Development Co. v. Electrical Workers, 367  U.S. 396, 415  (1961) (utility's investment not to be considered by Commission in its licensing decisions). The Nuclear Regulatory Commission (NRC), which now exercises the AEC's regulatory authority, does not purport to exercise its authority based on economic considerations, 10 CFR 8.4 (1982), and has recently repealed its regulations concerning the financial qualifications and capabilities of a utility proposing to construct and operate a nuclear powerplant. 47 Fed. Reg. 13751 (1982). In its notice of rule repeal, the NRC stated that utility financial qualifications are only of concern to the NRC if related to the public health and safety. 18 It is [461  U.S. 190, 208] almost inconceivable that Congress would have left a regulatory vacuum; the only reasonable inference is that Congress intended the States to continue to make these judgments. Any doubt that ratemaking and plant-need questions were to remain in state hands was removed by 271, 42 U.S.C. 2018, which provided:

"Nothing in this chapter shall be construed to affect the authority or regulations of any Federal, State or local agency with respect to the generation, sale, or transmission of electric power produced through the use of nuclear facilities licensed by the Commission . . . ."

The legislative Reports accompanying this provision do little more than restate the statutory language, S. Rep. No. 1699, 83d Cong., 2d Sess., 31 (1954); H. R. Rep. No. 2181, supra, at 31, but statements on the floor of Congress confirm that while the safety of nuclear technology was the exclusive business of the Federal Government, state power over the production of electricity was not otherwise displaced. 19

The 1959 amendments reinforced this fundamental division of authority. In 1959, Congress amended the Atomic Energy Act in order to "clarify the respective responsibilities  [461  U.S. 190, 209] . . . of the States and the Commission with respect to the regulation of byproduct, source, and special nuclear materials." 42 U.S.C. 2021(a)(1). See S. Rep. No. 870, 86th Cong., 1st Sess., 8, 10-12 (1959). The authority of the States over the planning for new powerplants and ratemaking were not at issue. Indeed, the point of the 1959 Amendments was to heighten the States' role. Section 274(b), 42 U.S.C. 2021(b), authorized the NRC, by agreements with state governors to discontinue its regulatory authority over certain nuclear materials under limited conditions. 20  State programs permitted under the amendment were required to be "coordinated and compatible" with that of the NRC. 2021(g); S. Rep. No. 870, supra, at 11. The subject matters of those agreements were also limited by 274(c), 42 U.S.C. 2021(c), which states:

"[T]he Commission shall retain authority and responsibility with respect to regulation of -

"(1) the construction and operation of any production or utilization facility;

.  .   .   .  .

"(4) the disposal of such . . . byproduct, source, or special nuclear material as the Commission determines . . . should, because of the hazards or potential hazards thereof, not be so disposed of without a license from the Commission."

Although the authority reserved by 274(c) was exclusively for the Commission to exercise, see S. Rep. No. 870, supra, at 8, 9; H.R. Rep. No. 1125, 86th Cong., 1st Sess., 8, 9 (1959), Congress made clear that the section was not intended to cut back on pre-existing state authority outside the [461 U.S. 190, 210] NRC's jurisdiction. 21 Section 274(k), 42 U.S.C. 2021(k), states:

"Nothing in this section shall be construed to affect the authority of any State or local agency to regulate activities for purposes other than protection against radiation hazards."

Section 274(k), by itself, limits only the pre-emptive effect of "this section," that is, 274, and does not represent an affirmative grant of power to the States. But Congress, by permitting regulation "for purposes other than protection against radiation hazards" underscored the distinction drawn in 1954 between the spheres of activity left respectively to the Federal Government and the States.

This regulatory structure has remained unchanged, for our purposes, until 1965, when the following proviso was added to 271:

"Provided, that this section shall not be deemed to confer upon any Federal, State or local agency any authority to regulate, control, or restrict any activities of the Commission."

The accompanying Report by the Joint Committee on Atomic Energy makes clear that the amendment was not intended to detract from state authority over energy facilities. 22  Instead, [461  U.S. 190, 211] the proviso was added to overrule a Court of Appeals opinion which interpreted 271 to allow a municipality to prohibit transmission lines necessary for the AEC's own activities. Maun v. United States, 347 F.2d 970 (CA9 1965). There is no indication that Congress intended any broader limitation of state regulatory power over utility companies. Indeed, Reports and debates accompanying the 1965 amendment indicate that 271's purpose "was to make it absolutely clear that the Atomic Energy Act's special provisions on licensing of reactors did not disturb the status quo with respect to the then existing authority of Federal, State, and local bodies to regulate generation, sale, or transmission of electric power." 111 Cong. Rec. 19822 (1965) (statement of Sen. Hickenlooper). 23

This account indicates that from the passage of the Atomic Energy Act in 1954, through several revisions, and to the present day, Congress has preserved the dual regulation of [461  U.S. 190, 212] nuclear-powered electricity generation: the Federal Government maintains complete control of the safety and "nuclear" aspects of energy generation; the States exercise their traditional authority over the need for additional generating capacity, the type of generating facilities to be licensed, land use, ratemaking, and the like. 24

The above is not particularly controversial. But deciding how 25524.2 is to be construed and classified is a more difficult proposition. At the outset, we emphasize that the statute does not seek to regulate the construction or operation of a nuclear powerplant. It would clearly be impermissible for California to attempt to do so, for such regulation, even if enacted out of nonsafety concerns, would nevertheless directly conflict with the NRC's exclusive authority over plant construction and operation. Respondents appear to concede as much. Respondents do broadly argue, however, that although safety regulation of nuclear plants by States is forbidden, a State may completely prohibit new construction until its safety concerns are satisfied by the Federal Government. We reject this line of reasoning. State safety regulation is not pre-empted only when it conflicts with federal law. Rather, the Federal Government has occupied the entire field of nuclear safety concerns, except the limited powers expressly ceded to the States. 25  When the Federal Government [461  U.S. 190, 213] completely occupies a given field or an identifiable portion of it, as it has done here, the test of pre-emption is whether "the matter on which the State asserts the right to act is in any way regulated by the Federal Act." Rice v. Santa Fe Elevator Corp. 331  U.S. at 236. A state moratorium on nuclear construction grounded in safety concerns falls squarely within the prohibited field. Moreover, a state judgment that nuclear power is not safe enough to be further developed would conflict directly with the countervailing judgment of the NRC, see, infra, at 218-219, that nuclear construction may proceed notwithstanding extant uncertainties as to waste disposal. A state prohibition on nuclear construction for safety reasons would also be in the teeth of the Atomic Energy Act's objective to insure that nuclear technology be safe enough for widespread development and use - and would be pre-empted for that reason. Infra, at 221-222.

That being the case, it is necessary to determine whether there is a nonsafety rationale for 25524.2. California has maintained, and the Court of Appeals agreed, that 25524.2 was aimed at economic problems, not radiation hazards. The California Assembly Committee on Resources, Land Use, and Energy, which proposed a package of bills including 25524.2, reported that the waste disposal problem was "largely economic or the result of poor planning, not safety related." Reassessment of Nuclear Energy in California: A Policy Analysis of Proposition 15 and its Alternatives, p. 18 (1976) (Reassessment Report) (emphasis in original). The Committee explained that the lack of a federally approved method of waste disposal created a "clog" in the nuclear fuel cycle. Storage space was limited while more nuclear wastes were continuously produced. Without a permanent means of disposal, the nuclear waste problem could become critical,  [461  U.S. 190, 214] leading to unpredictably high costs to contain the problem or, worse, shutdowns in reactors. "Waste disposal safety," the Reassessment Report notes, "is not directly addressed by the bills, which ask only that a method [of waste disposal] be chosen and accepted by the federal government." Id., at 156 (emphasis in original).

The Court of Appeals adopted this reading of 25524.2. Relying on the Reassessment Report, the court concluded:

"[S]ection 25524.2 is directed towards purposes other than protection against radiation hazards. While Proposition 15 would have required California to judge the safety of a proposed method of waste disposal, section 25524.2 leaves that judgment to the federal government. California is concerned not with the adequacy of the method, but rather with its existence." 659 F.2d, at 925.

Our general practice is to place considerable confidence in the interpretations of state law reached by the federal courts of appeals. Cf. Mills v. Rogers, 457  U.S. 291, 306 (1982); Bishop v. Wood, 426  U.S. 341, 346 (1976). Petitioners and amici nevertheless attempt to upset this interpretation in a number of ways. First, they maintain that 25524.2 evinces no concern with the economics of nuclear power. The statute states that the "development" and "existence" of a permanent disposal technology approved by federal authorities will lift the moratorium; the statute does not provide for considering the economic costs of the technology selected. This view of the statute is overly myopic. Once a technology is selected and demonstrated, the utilities and the California Public Utilities Commission would be able to estimate costs; such cost estimates cannot be made until the Federal Government has settled upon the method of long-term waste disposal. Moreover, once a satisfactory disposal technology is found and demonstrated, fears of having to close down operating reactors should largely evaporate. [461  U.S. 190, 215]

Second, it is suggested that California, if concerned with economics, would have banned California utilities from building plants outside the State. This objection carries little force. There is no indication that California utilities are contemplating such construction; the state legislature is not obligated to address purely hypothetical facets of a problem.

Third, petitioners note that there already is a body, the California Public Utilities Commission, which is authorized to determine on economic grounds whether a nuclear powerplant should be constructed. 26  While California is certainly free to make these decisions on a case-by-case basis, a State is not foreclosed from reaching the same decision through a legislative judgment, applicable to all cases. The economic uncertainties engendered by the nuclear waste disposal problems are not factors that vary from facility to facility; the issue readily lends itself to more generalized decisionmaking and California cannot be faulted for pursuing that course.

Fourth, petitioners note that Proposition 15, the initiative out of which 25524.2 arose, and companion provisions in California's so-called nuclear laws, are more clearly written with safety purposes in mind. 27  It is suggested that 25524.2 shares a common heritage with these laws and should be presumed to have been enacted for the same purposes. [461  U.S. 190, 216] The short answer here is that these other state laws are not before the Court, and indeed, Proposition 15 was not passed; these provisions and their pedigree do not taint other parts of the Warren-Alquist Act.

Although these specific indicia of California's intent in enacting 25524.2 are subject to varying interpretation, there are two further reasons why we should not become embroiled in attempting to ascertain California's true motive. First, inquiry into legislative motive is often an unsatisfactory venture. United States v. O'Brien, 391  U.S. 367, 383 (1968). What motivates one legislator to vote for a statute is not necessarily what motivates scores of others to enact it. Second, it would be particularly pointless for us to engage in such inquiry here when it is clear that the States have been allowed to retain authority over the need for electrical generating facilities easily sufficient to permit a State so inclined to halt the construction of new nuclear plants by refusing on economic grounds to issue certificates of public convenience in individual proceedings. In these circumstances, it should be up to Congress to determine whether a State has misused the authority left in its hands.

Therefore, we accept California's avowed economic purpose as the rationale for enacting 25524.2. Accordingly, the statute lies outside the occupied field of nuclear safety regulation. 28 [461  U.S. 190, 217] 

Response to first argument. From the time the federal act was passed in 1954 until the present, White explained, Congress had maintained a system of dual regulation over nuclear plants: the federal government held control over safety issues, whereas the states exercised "their traditional authority over economic questions such as the need for additional generating capacity, the type of generating facilities to be licensed, land use, and ratemaking." The Court held that 25524.2 was directed toward economics, rather than safety, in its purpose and thus was fully within California's authority.

Response to second argument. 

Nor did 25524.2 in any way conflict with national policy, even with a decision by the Nuclear Regulatory Commission (NRC) to allow continued licensing of reactors despite concerns regarding waste disposal. Again, the NRC's authority, as that of a federal nuclear regulatory agency, was in the realm of safety, leaving states to make economic determinations regarding nuclear power. White wrote, :And as there is no attempt on California's part to enter the field of developing and licensing nuclear waste disposal technology, a field occupied by the Federal Government, 25524.2 is not preempted any more by the NRC's obligations in the waste disposal field than by its licensing power over the plants themselves. Furthermore, the Nuclear Waste Policy Act, enacted into law by Congress in 1982, did not appear to have been passed with the intention of superseding states' decision-making power with regard to waste disposal and the opening of new plants.

Response to third argument Finally, section 25524.2 did not in any way operate at cross-purposes to the aim embodied in the Atomic Energy Act of developing commercial uses for nuclear power. As the court of appeals had observed, Justice White wrote, "Promotion of nuclear power is not to be accomplished `at all costs.'" Instead, Congress had given the states authority to decide whether to build a nuclear plant or one using traditional fuel sources. "California's decision to exercise that authority does not, in itself, constitute a basis for preemption."

Concurrence in part
Justice Blackmun concurred in part and in the judgment. He took issue, however, with the idea implicit in the Court's argument that a state motivated solely by safety concerns, rather than economic ones, lacked the authority to prohibit the construction of nuclear plants. He then addressed the three reasons why the Court held that a safety-motivated decision to prohibit construction would be preempted:
1. "the Federal Government has occupied the entire field of nuclear safety";
Justice Blackmun argued that Congress had not attempted to control the wide field of "nuclear safety concerns," only the smaller realm of safe plant construction and operation. Thus if the federal government attempted to preempt the states, given the fact that its area of authority was not large enough to cover all contingencies, this would create a "regulatory vacuum."
2. a state judgment on safety would place a state in conflict with the NRC;
Blackmun argued that while the NRC had authority to determine whether it was safe for construction of a plant to proceed, it was not in a position to order that such construction take place.
3. a state moratorium on further plant construction would obstruct the Atomic Energy Act's objective "to insure that nuclear technology be safe enough for widespread development and use."
Blackmun maintained that the federal government's policy of encouraging nuclear development should not be interpreted as an attempt to prevent states from developing alternative sources of energy.

Subsequent Developments
In 1972 the Supreme Court affirmed a decision of the Court of Appeals for the Eighth Circuit, Northern States Power Co. v. Minnesota, which held that attempts by states to regulate radiation hazards were preempted by the Atomic Energy Act. However, this affirmation was by a memorandum without a written opinion. As such, Pacific Gas is often cited for holding that states are preempted from regulating the safety aspects and radiological hazards of nuclear power plants.

Later, more consequential Supreme Court cases related to the politics of nuclear power include Metropolitan Edison Co. v. People Against Nuclear Energy (1983), decided the same year, and Silkwood v. Kerr-McGee Corp. (1984).

Critical response
The majority opinion did not question California's assertion that the moratorium was justified because the lack of a permanent disposal method for high level waste made nuclear generation uneconomic. It has been noted that existing plants and plants constructed after the Supreme Court decision have continued to economically operate by expanding current waste storage facilities. In addition, by simply citing examples of the costs of cancelled nuclear construction projects such as WNP-3 and WNP-5 or Marble Hill, or of cost over-runs at plants such as Braidwood, a state could justify a statutory moratorium on all new nuclear generating plants on the basis that these plants are inherently uneconomic.

In the case of Silkwood v. Kerr-McGee Corp., 464 U.S. 238 (1984), which was decided the same year as Pacific Gas, the Supreme Court ruled that the Atomic Energy Act did not preempt the award of punitive damages for state tort claims involving radioactive contamination. One criticism is that Silkwood is inconsistent with Pacific Gas as the purpose of the punitive damages awarded was to punish and to alter conduct involving the safety of radiological controls, giving the state regulation over these activities through tort law.

See also
Pacific Gas & Electric v. Public Utilities Commission
Travelers Casualty & Surety Co. of America v. Pacific Gas & Elec. Co.
List of United States Supreme Court cases, volume 461

References

Further reading
"Constitutional Law--The Supremacy Clause--The California Nuclear Moratorium--Pacific Gas & Electric Co. v. Energy Resources Commission." New York Law School Law Review, Vol. 30, 1985.

External links
 

United States Supreme Court cases
United States Supreme Court cases of the Burger Court
United States federal preemption law
1983 in United States case law
United States energy case law
United States ripeness case law
Pacific Gas and Electric Company